Legislative elections for the Territorial Assembly were held in Wallis and Futuna on 10 March 2002. 32 lists contested the vote. The result was a victory for the coalition of Rally for the Republic and Voice of the Wallis and Futuna Peoples, which won 13 of the 20 seats. Following the election Patalione Kanimoa was re-elected as President of the Territorial Assembly by 12 votes to 7, with one member absent due to illness.

Results

References

Elections in Wallis and Futuna
Election and referendum articles with incomplete results
Wallis
Territorial elections
Wallis